Svinov is a former town, and since 20 March 1957 an administrative district of the city of Ostrava, Moravian-Silesian Region in the Czech Republic. It lies on the bank of the Odra River, in the Silesian area of the city. As of 2011 census, Svinov currently has population of 4,301. The district lies in the historical region of Silesia and was first mentioned in a written document in 1265.

History 
First buildings were established in the valley of the Porubka river, a left tributary of the Odra River. Settlement continued to expand in all directions with the years and also solitudes were established, one of them lies right next to Odra River. First mention appeared in written document by bishop of Olomouc, Bruno von Schauenburg, in 1265, described as monastery village of the Cistercian monastery in Velehrad.

In 1936, Svinov was promoted to a town, and since 1957 is one of administrative districts of the city of Ostrava. Mostly German Svinov was connected to Nazi Third Reich in 1938 as part of the Sudetenland. Svinov was liberated by the Red Army during the World War II on 30 April 1945.

In 1847 a railway station was built, and Svinov became an important railway junction on the Austrian Northern Railway. Quick industrialization followed and several transport companies were established. Since then Svinov railway station has been connected to several other railway lines and today it is the most important railway station in the city of Ostrava.

According to the Austrian census of 1910 the village had 3,274 inhabitants, 3,144 of whom had permanent residence there. Census asked people for their native language; 706 (22.5%) were German-speaking, 2,264 (72%) were Czech-speaking, and 174 (5.5%) were Polish-speaking. Jews were not allowed to declare Yiddish, most of them thus declared the German language as their native. The most populous religious groups were Roman Catholics with 3,075 (93.9%), followed by the Jews with 124 (3.8%).

Symbols 

The emblem of Svinov and the flag were given by Resolution of the City Council of Ostrava no.3581/90 of 4 October 1994.

Emblem 
Green-gold askew-divided shield, gold grain sheaf with a golden flail at the top, a black winged railway wheel at the bottom.

Flag 
Obverse is same as the emblem, reverse consists of  three horizontal stripes - yellow, red and green.

Notable people 
 Jan Foltys - international chess champion
 Karl Scheit - guitarist, lute player and music teacher

Footnotes

References

 

Ostrava
Neighbourhoods in the Czech Republic